Alan Richard Bell (born 10 June 1957) is a British sprinter. He competed in the men's 400 metres at the 1980 Summer Olympics.

References

1957 births
Living people
Athletes (track and field) at the 1980 Summer Olympics
British male sprinters
Olympic athletes of Great Britain
Sportspeople from Wakefield